Bisoxatin is a laxative.

References

Phenols
Lactams
Laxatives
Benzoxazines